Liliana Berry Davis Mumy (born April 16, 1994) is an American actress. Between 2002 and 2006, she appeared as Jessica Baker in the two Cheaper by the Dozen movies and as Lucy Miller in the second and third films of The Santa Clause trilogy.

In animation, Mumy performed the voice of Mertle Edmonds in the Lilo & Stitch franchise as well as Twinkle in Higglytown Heroes. For Cartoon Network she has voiced Panini in Chowder. For Nickelodeon, she has voiced Human Kimberly in Catscratch, Roxy in the Nickelodeon revival of Winx Club, and Leni Loud in The Loud House.

Personal life
Mumy was born in San Marcos, California, the daughter of Eileen Joy Mumy (née Davis), a childbirth educator, and former child star Bill Mumy. She is the younger sister of former child actor Seth Mumy. She graduated from Laurel Hall School in North Hollywood, California and attended Campbell Hall School. She left there and graduated from Notre Dame High School in Sherman Oaks, California in 2012.

Liliana appeared with her father, Bill Mumy, in the Twilight Zone revival series' episode "It's Still a Good Life".

Career
Mumy has appeared in several motion pictures. Her most notable film appearances are in Cheaper by the Dozen, Cheaper by the Dozen 2, The Santa Clause 2, as well as The Santa Clause 3: The Escape Clause. In 2002, Mumy played Audrey Fremont, the daughter of her father Bill's character Anthony, in a sequel to the classic The Twilight Zone episode "It's a Good Life" called "It's Still a Good Life".

Mumy provided the voice of Mertle Edmonds (Lilo Pelekai's rival) in Stitch! The Movie, Lilo & Stitch: The Series, Lilo & Stitch 2: Stitch Has a Glitch, and Leroy & Stitch, and voicing a character with a smaller role on American Dragon: Jake Long as Haley's rival at school. She is also the voice of Twinkle on Higglytown Heroes and the voice of Human Kimberly on Nickelodeon's Catscratch. Lesser roles included TV appearances playing Rachael/Rachel in six episodes on My Wife and Kids from 2002 to 2004 as well as young Donna on That '70s Show and guest starring in Scrubs as a girl at her birthday party (whose face J.D. daydreams of shoving into her cake). She also voiced Panini in the cartoon Chowder, airing on Cartoon Network and played Lula in The Cleaner in 2008. She also voiced a feisty, fashionable, pink-loving, golden retriever puppy named Rosebud in the Disney movies Snow Buddies, Space Buddies, and Santa Buddies. In June 2012, Mumy started voice work as 'Beth' in Bravest Warriors, an animated series created by Pendleton Ward, produced by Frederator Studios for their channel, Cartoon Hangover, a premium content partner of YouTube. Mumy also provided the voice of Roxy on Nickelodeon's Winx Club and Leni Loud on Nickelodeon's The Loud House.

Filmography

Television

Films

References

External links

1994 births
Living people
Actresses from Los Angeles
American child actresses
American film actresses
American television actresses
American voice actresses
Notre Dame High School (Sherman Oaks, California) alumni
People from San Marcos, California
21st-century American actresses